

The LIPNUR Kumbang was a project by Indonesia's aerospace industry to develop a locally produced four-seat utility aircraft. Work was cancelled before the aircraft actually flew. One source describes it as a rotary-wing design.

Specifications

References
 
 Harapan dan Tanggapan Pemerhati dan Mitra

Aircraft manufactured in Indonesia